Lumo is a 3D isometric puzzle platform game developed by Triple Eh? Ltd. It was released for PlayStation 4, PlayStation Vita, Microsoft Windows and Xbox One in 2016 and for the Nintendo Switch in 2017.

Gameplay

In Lumo, the player completes a series of puzzles in over 400 rooms to complete the game. The game places a heavy emphasis on exploration and discovering secrets and contains multiple hidden challenges and minigames.

Soundtrack

The soundtrack for Lumo was produced by artist Phil Nixon under the name Dopedemand and was released on Bandcamp in 2014, almost 2 years before the game itself was initially released. The soundtrack contains 21 tracks, although one of them was not used in the game itself.

Reception

Lumo received "generally favorable" reviews for Microsoft Windows and Nintendo Switch and received "mixed or average" reviews for PlayStation 4 and Xbox One.

References

External links 
 

2016 video games
Linux games
MacOS games
Nintendo Switch games
PlayStation 4 games
PlayStation Vita games
Xbox One games
Single-player video games
Video games about witchcraft
Video games developed in the United Kingdom
Windows games
Rising Star Games games